Adrian Leat (born 22 September 1987) is a New Zealand judoka. He competed in the Men's 73 kg event at the 2014 Commonwealth Games where he won the silver medal. His older brother Alister Leat was also a representative judoka.

References

External links 
 Adrian Leat at The-Sports.org
 Adrian Leat at judoinside.com
 

1987 births
Living people
New Zealand male judoka
Commonwealth Games silver medallists for New Zealand
Judoka at the 2014 Commonwealth Games
Commonwealth Games medallists in judo
Medallists at the 2014 Commonwealth Games